Livingston Recording Studios is a recording studio in West London.

The studios were started by Ray Kinsey, a film director from North London, who branched out into recording talking books for the blind. The first Livingston Studio designed for recording music was set up in Barnet UK during 1963 where work on talking books continued alongside the recording of folk music. Kinsey's son, Nick Kinsey, joined the company in 1966. Nick Kinsey started to develop the studios continuing with the recording of folk music and branching out into pop music. He  recorded artists such as Sweeney's Men, Pentangle, Iain Matthews and Russ Ballard. Nick Kinsey bought the studio from Fred Livingston-Hogg an Oxford-based business man who had been involved with the Livingston Hire Group, with the help of Alan Tomkins and Michael Smee, and rebuilt it.

Livingston Studios were purchased by Miloco Studios in 2012, who continue to run the studio.

History
During 1980, Nick Kinsey decided to expand the business and move to an old Church hall in Wood Green and transformed it into a hi-tech studio. In 1985, a second studio was added and Jerry and Mary Boys joined the company. By 1987 they had opened two more studios in Guillemot Place North London.

In 1993, Livingston succumbed to the nationwide recession in UK and the Guillemot studios were closed down. The Brook Road studios were acquired by Jerry Boys and Dave Margereson who owned the music management company Mismanagement and the new company 'Livingston Recording Studios Ltd' was set up.

Nick Gold, producer and owner of the World circuit record label, met Jerry Boys after working together on an album with Oumou Sangaré and they started to work together with the Buena Vista Social Club. The Buena Vista Social Club's eponymous multi million selling first album was recorded at Egrem studios, Havana and  mixed by  Boys and Gold at Livingston Studios. They released it on their World Circuit label in 1997.

Björk's debut album Debut (1993) was recorded and mixed at Livingston Studios by producer Marius De Vries. It sold over 2.5m copies worldwide.

In 2001, Gold bought the company from Boys which enabled most of World Circuit's artists to be record and mix their music at Livingston Studios.

Gold sold Livingston to global recording studio directory Miloco Studios in 2012, who renovated the studio in October of that year and re-launched the studio alongside producer Mike Crossey. Since then artists such as The 1975, Arctic Monkeys, Låpsley, Gin Wigmore, Hozier and Ben Howard have all worked on projects at Livingston Studios with Mike Crossey

In 2015, Miloco Studios renovated Studio 2, installing Augspurger Monitors and a Custom Series 75 console powered by Neve. Livingston Studio 1 was also renovated and upgraded with new equipment, including a pair of Augspurger Duo-12 monitors.

Artists who have used Livingston Studios 

A
A&G Records
Adam Seymour
Adrian Hall
Adrian Sherwood
Afro Cuban All Stars
Alex Wilson
Ali Farka Toure
Andy Scart
Andy Thornton
Ash
Asian Dub Foundation
Athena
Atlantic*
B
Barb Jungr
Basement
Balenescu Quartet
Bellowhead
Bernard Butler
Beth Orton
Betty Steeles
Big Linda
Björk
Blondelle
Blowup Records
Bobby Kray
Box of Frogs
Brass Monkey
Buena Vista Social Club
Bush*
C
Cameron McVey
Candid Records
Calum Malcolm
The Cat Empire
CEC Management
Chris Kimsey
Chris Sheldon*
D
Danny Shogger
The Datsuns
Damien Saez
Dave Eringa
Dave Evans 
David Ward Films
Dennis Bovell
Del Amitri
Dimi Mint Abba
Dimitri*
E
The Ebony Tower
Elova
The Enemy
Enjoy Destroy
Erol Alkan
Eyes Wide Open*
F
Feeder
Fierce And The Dead
The Friendly
Fires
Future Cut*
G
Gil Norton
Graham Dominy
Greg Haver
Sean Genocky
Gyroscope
H
Hello
Hamish Imlach
Hate Gallery
Hogg*
I
Ian Broudie
Iain Matthews
Ian Shaw
Ibrahim Ferrer
Imelda May
Island
Issie Barrett*
J
Jamie Cullum
Jazz Jamaica
Jerry Boys
Jimmy Roberts
Joe Boyd
Joe Lean & The Jing Jang
Joe Stilgoe
John Cornfield
John Gallen
John Leckie
John Martyn
John Renbourn
Johnny Panic*
Jong
Justin Hayward

K
KK
Kaitee Page
Ken Rose
Kasai Masai
Kate Rusby*
L
Labi Siffre
Låpsley
The Libertines
Lou Rhodes
Luan Parle
Luis Jardin
Lunic*
M
Manic Street Preachers
Mansun
Marius De Vries
Mark Morgan
Mark Rankin
Matt Stevens
Melanie C
Mercury
Michael Kiwanuka
Mike Neilson
Minus 1
The Mission
Muse*
N
Nick Abbott
Nick Gold
Nizlopi
Norman Cook*
O
The Opera Babes
Orchestra Baobab
Oumou Sangaré
Owen Morris*
P
Paul Borg
Pedro Ferreira
Pee Wee Ellis
Peter Borthwick
Placebo
Plan B
Polydor
Portico Quartet
Primal Scream*
R
Emre Ramazanoglu
Rafe McKenna
The Rakes
The Rank Deluxxe
Reuben
R.E.M.
Richard Norris
Robert Kirby
Ronan Keating
Rough Trade
Roy Merchant
Russ Ballard
Ry Cooder*
S
Saxon (band) 
George Shilling
Shakira
Siskin
The Smiths
Sports Team
Sonny
Spike Drake
Steve Lironi
Steve Orchard
Steve Osbourne
Sweeney's Men
Symmetric Orchestra*
T
Terry Thomas
Tom Leader
Tom McRae
Brian Tench
Tom Richards
Tony Platt
TrailVega 4*
Twenty One Pilots
U
Universal *
V
Voces 8*
W
West One Music
Wet Wet Wet
The Winter Kids
The Waterboys*
Wolf Alice
X
Xmal Deutschland
Y
Youssou N'Dour

References 

Recording studios in London